Paul Bolster (born February 6, 1944) is an American politician. He served as a Democratic member for the 30th district of the Georgia House of Representatives.

Life and career
Bolster was born in Hancock County, Maine. He attended Eastern Baptist College, earning a bachelor’s degree in 1966. He also attended the University of Mississippi, where he earned his master’s degree in 1967, the University of Georgia, earning a doctorate in 1972, and Georgia State University, where he received his Juris Doctor degree.

In 1975, Bolster was elected to represent the 30th district of the Georgia House of Representatives. In 1987, he left office after he decided not to run for re-election in 1986. Bolster worked at Clark College. He was a historian.

References 

1944 births
Living people
People from Hancock County, Maine
Democratic Party members of the Georgia House of Representatives
20th-century American politicians
University of Mississippi alumni
University of Georgia alumni
Georgia State University alumni
American historians
20th-century American historians
21st-century American historians